Sampil is a surname. Notable people with this surname include:

 Abdoulaye Sekou Sampil (born 1984), French-Senegalese footballer
  (1863–1935), Spanish jurist
 Peter Sampil (born 1974), French footballer